Parry Nickerson (born October 11, 1994) is an American football cornerback who is a free agent. He played college football at Tulane.

College career
Nickerson played college football at Tulane. During his first season he suffered a bad knee injury that was career threatening. However, he was able to make a comeback and play in the next 48 games with 46 starts. Over this time, Nickerson totalled 16 interceptions with 31 pass deflections. He was considered a Jim Thorpe Award semi-finalist during his senior season in 2017. For his senior season, he concluded the season with 55 total tackles, 2 tackles for loss, 6 interceptions, and 8 pass deflections.

Professional career
At the 2018 NFL Combine, Nickerson ran a 4.32-second 40-yard dash, which tied two other cornerbacks, LSU's Donte Jackson and Ohio State's Denzel Ward for the fastest time.

New York Jets
Nickerson was drafted by the New York Jets in the sixth round (179th overall) of the 2018 NFL Draft.

Nickerson made his NFL debut on September 10, 2018 in a 48–17 win against the Detroit Lions, recording one tackle and receiving a taunting penalty on his first career play on defense. He made his first career start on October 14, 2018 in a 42–34 win over the Indianapolis Colts, making four tackles and deflecting a pass.

Seattle Seahawks
On August 31, 2019, Nickerson was traded to the Seattle Seahawks in exchange for a conditional 2021 seventh-round pick. He was waived on September 10, 2019 and re-signed to the practice squad. He was released on October 15.

Jacksonville Jaguars
On October 17, 2019, Nickerson was signed by the Jacksonville Jaguars. He was waived on October 21, 2019 and re-signed to the practice squad. He was promoted to the active roster on December 3, 2019.

Nickerson was placed on the reserve/COVID-19 list by the Jaguars on July 30, 2020, and was activated six days later. He was waived on September 5, 2020.

Green Bay Packers
Nickerson signed with the Green Bay Packers on September 7, 2020. He was placed on injured reserve on October 20, 2020. He was designated to return from injured reserve on January 20, 2021, and began practicing with the team again, but he was not activated before the end of the postseason.

Minnesota Vikings
On May 17, 2021, Nickerson signed with the Minnesota Vikings. He was waived on August 31, 2021 and re-signed to the practice squad the next day. He signed a reserve/future contract with the Vikings on January 10, 2022.

Nickerson was released by the Vikings on August 30, 2022. He was signed to the practice squad one day later. He was released on September 27. He was re-signed on November 15.

NFL career statistics

Regular season

References

External links
Tulane Green Wave bio
Minnesota Vikings bio

1994 births
Living people
American football cornerbacks
Green Bay Packers players
Jacksonville Jaguars players
Minnesota Vikings players
New York Jets players
Players of American football from New Orleans
Seattle Seahawks players
Tulane Green Wave football players